This is a list of British natural gas companies.

Exploration and production:
Cuadrilla Resources
IGas Energy

Utilities:
British Gas (also uses Scottish Gas and Nwy Prydain brands) (parent company Centrica)
EDF Energy (parent of London Energy, Seeboard, and SWEB Energy)
Npower (parent company RWE)
Powergen Retail (parent Company E.ON)
SSE (parent of Scottish Hydro, Southern Electric and Swalec)
Scottish Power
Total Gas & Power
Niccolo
Bulb
Ovo Energy
British Natural Gas (known as HM British Natural Gas Ltd)

Other companies:
National Grid, previously known as Transco

See also 
Lists of public utilities
 Npower UK

 
Natural Gas
Lists of energy companies